Progressive transformation of germinal centres (PTGCs) is a reactive lymph node process of undetermined cause.

Signs and symptoms
PTGC is usually characterized by localized lymphadenopathy and is otherwise typically asymptomatic.

Diagnosis

PTGC is diagnosed by surgical excision of the affected lymph node(s), and examination by a pathologist.  The differential diagnosis includes non-neoplastic causes of lymphadenopathy (e.g. cat-scratch fever, Kikuchi disease) and malignancy, i.e. cancer.

Microscopic appearance
PTGCs is characterized by:
 follicular hyperplasia (many follicles),
 focally large germinal centres, with poorly demarcated germinal centre (GC)/mantle zone interfaces (as GCs infiltrated by mantle zone lymphocytes), and
 an expanded mantle zone.

Treatment
PTGC is treated by excisional biopsy and follow-up.  It may occasionally recur and a small proportion of patients have been reported to subsequently develop nodular lymphocyte predominant Hodgkin lymphoma.

See also
Lymphadenopathy
Nodular lymphocyte predominant Hodgkin lymphoma

References

External links 

Hematopathology